Majid Khodabakhsh (born 1956 in Ardabil) is an Iranian moderate reformist politician, and the current Governor of East Azerbaijan since 2017, in the Government of Hassan Rouhani. He was previously Governor of Ardebil Province from 2013 to 2017, and also was former Deputy Governor of East Azerbaijan and West Azerbaijan.

References

1956 births
People from Ardabil
Living people
Governors of Ardabil Province
Governors of East Azerbaijan Province
Iranian reformists